The Bible of Borso d'Este is a two volume manuscript. The illuminated miniatures, work of Taddeo Crivelli and others, were executed between 1455 and 1461. The work is held in the Biblioteca Estense di Modena (Ms. Lat. 422-423.)

History 
The Bible of Borso d'Este is one of the most notable illuminated manuscripts of the Renaissance. It was executed over a six-year period by a team of artists directed by Taddeo Crivelli and Franco dei Russi. It was taken from Ferrara to Modena in 1598, where it remained until the end of the duchy in 1859. Then it was taken together with the most precious treasures of the royal house by Francesco V. Carried out of Italy, it was recovered during the First World War when it was acquired by a senator, Giovanni Treccani. It was then donated to the Modena library.

Description and style 
Every page of the Bible is decorated with an elegant frame of scrolls and other ornaments, surrounding two columns of texts. The margins contain various scenes, especially in the lower parts, where one often finds scenes drawn in perspective, borrowing from advances in painting of the time. Scenes are also depicted between the columns of text, usually next to the capital or illuminated letters. In the volutes in the corners, there are often animals, depicted with lively imagination that is part of the courtly style of the time, and often tied to heraldic symbols of Borso and his family.

Other Images

Reproductions 
In 1923, the businessman Giovanni Treccani acquired in Paris, for the enormous sum of 5 million lire, the Borso d'Este Bible, that was due to be sold in America, and donated it to the Kingdom of Italy. On his initiative, various other copies have been created

Bibliography 
 Stefano Zuffi, Il Quattrocento, Electa, Milano 2004. 
 Published completely on the site of the Estense Library: http://bibliotecaestense.beniculturali.it/info/img/mss/i-mo-beu-v.g.12.html http://bibliotecaestense.beniculturali.it/info/img/mss/i-mo-beu-v.g.13.html
 La Bibbia di Borso D'Este. Riprodotta integralmente per mandato di Giovanni Treccani. Con documenti e studio storico-artistico di Adolfo Venturi, Aa.vv., Emilio Bestetti Editore D'Arte, Milano, 1937. Riprodotta integralmente per mandato di Giovanni Treccani con documenti e studio storico-artistico di Adolfo Venturi. Il testo è su due colonne incorniciate da fregi e figure in bianco e nero. Numerose tavole di pagine con fregi e miniature a colori riprodotte fuori testo ed una tavola applicata a colori con ritratto di Borso D'Este. 2 Voll., cm.31x41,5,(in folio) pp. 68, 311, 292. titolo in oro e impressioni a secco ai piatti, sguardie in seta con stemma in oro. legg.ed.cartonata, dorsi con fregi in oro.  
 La Bibbia di Borso d'Este. TRECCANI DEGLI ALFIERI, Giovanni - VENTURI, Adolfo, Banca Popolare e Poligrafiche Bolis, Bergamo, 1962. A cura di Giovanni Treccani degli Alfieri con documenti e studio storico-artistico di Adolfo Venturi. Riproduzione integrale del testo in nero ed in parte su tavole a 12 colori e oro battuto applicato a mano. 2 voll. cm.30,5x42, pp. 1300 nn. cofanetto fasciato in velluto. ( legg.ed.in pelle, nervi i titoli in oro ai dorsi, stemma in argento applicato sul piatto ant.
 La Bibbia di Borso d'Este : ms. Lat. 422-423, Biblioteca Estense e universitaria, ( Facsimile e Commentario )AA.VV:, Franco Cosimo Panini, Modena, 1997. Rilegato. Condizione libro: As New. Condizione sovraccoperta: As New. 1ère Édition. 41 Cm. Citazioni 6  Titolo La Bibbia di Borso d'Este : ms. Lat. 422-423, Biblioteca Estense e universitaria, Modena : Ferrara, seconda metà del 15. secolo Pubblicazione \Roma! : Istituto della Enciclopedia italiana ; Modena : F. C. Panini Descrizione fisica v. ; 41 cm Note generali Ed. di 750 esempl. di cui 748 num. Titolo uniforme Bibbia, Comprende 1 2 Commentario al codice. - Classificazione Dewey 220.47

External links 
 Biblia Latina [Bible of Borso d'Este], v.1
 Biblia Latina [Bible of Borso d'Este], v.2

Este collection
15th-century illuminated manuscripts
Modena